Christus Dominus (Christ the Lord; abbreviation "CD") is the Second Vatican Council's "Decree on the Pastoral Office of Bishops". 

The document was approved by a vote of 2,319 to 2 of the assembled bishops and was promulgated by Pope Paul VI on 28 October 1965.  Christus Dominus calls for strong episcopal conferences of bishops, to set the standard for the church in their region, while fully supporting the Vatican and the Pope.  

CD describes how bishops exercise their office at three levels: in the universal church (chapter one), in their own "particular church" or diocese (chapter two), and at the regional or national level (chapter three).

Background
The First Vatican Council of 1869–1870 focused on the pope and defined the doctrine of "papal infallibility" but did not discuss other bishops. Thus, when Pope John XXIII called for a Second Vatican Council, everyone expected it to take up this unfinished business.

Apostolic College
The role of the bishops of the church was brought into renewed prominence, especially when seen collectively, as a college that has succeeded to that of the apostles in teaching and governing the church. This college does not exist without its head, the successor of St. Peter.

In these days especially bishops frequently are unable to fulfill their office effectively and fruitfully unless they develop a common effort involving constant growth in harmony and closeness of ties with other bishops. Episcopal conferences already established in many nations-have furnished outstanding proofs of a more fruitful apostolate. Therefore, this sacred synod considers it to be supremely fitting that everywhere bishops belonging to the same nation or region form an association which would meet at fixed times. Thus, when the insights of prudence and experience have been shared and views exchanged, there will emerge a holy union of energies in the service of the common good of the churches. (CD 37)

Preliminary note
Accordingly, claims made by some, that the council gave the church two separate earthly heads, the College of Bishops and the Pope, were countered by the Preliminary Explanatory Note added to the Dogmatic Constitution on the Church Lumen Gentium and printed at the end of the text.

This Note states:
There is no such thing as the college without its head ... and in the college the head preserves intact his function as Vicar of Christ and pastor of the universal Church. In other words it is not a distinction between the Roman Pontiff and the bishops taken together, but between the Roman Pontiff by himself and the Roman Pontiff along with the bishops.

See also
 Appointment of Catholic bishops
 Hierarchy of the Catholic Church
 Lists of patriarchs, archbishops, and bishops

References

External links 

 Text on the Vatican website

Decrees
Documents of the Second Vatican Council
Episcopacy in the Catholic Church
Latin texts
1965 documents
1965 in Christianity